Cem Erman, born Süleyman Faik Durgun (1947 – 7 August 2011) was a Turkish film actor. His father's side was originally from Mersin and his mother's side was from Halep. He had also two more brothers and sisters. He was the youngest in the family. In 2007 he married Sevim Demiroğlu, then shortly after their marriage, they got divorced. After a while they start having a relationship again and till his death the couple were together. He died while he was reading a book. He was buried in Kabasakal Cemetery.

Overview
His career in the show business started in 1973 as he reached the third place in a competition supported by Ses dergisi (a Turkish magazine).

He performed in more than 100 Turkish films, and also His character has been used also in comics for both Turkish news papers Saklambaç and Kelebek. He has never been paid properly during his acting career according to his statement when he was interviewed about his earning.

Filmography

He has acted in these following Turkish films:

 Özleyiş (1974) (he was the main character in the film),
 Öfke (he was the main character in the film)
 Üç Öfkeli Adam (Three Angry Men, he was the main character in the film)
 Ağa Bacı (1986) (he was the main character in the film)
 Talihsizler (1974)
 Yüz Numaralı Adam (1978)
 Sahibini Arayan Madalya
 Sen Yaşa 
 Canımın Canısın 
 Canımdan Can

References

1947 births
People from Adana
People from İskenderun
Turkish male film actors
2011 deaths
20th-century Turkish male actors